John M. Baer is a political columnist with The (Harrisburg, Pa.) Patriot-News/PennLive, formerly with The Philadelphia Daily News/Philadelphia Inquirer.

Career
Baer has won numerous awards for column-writing and investigative journalism, including honors from the Associated Press Managing Editors, the Pennsylvania Society of Professional Journalists and the Pennsylvania Newspaper Association. In 2018, he won First Place in the Pennsylvania Bar Association's Media Awards for commentary on issues of law and justice. In 2015, he won First Place for column-writing in the Pennsylvania Newsmedia Association's Keystone Press Awards and First Place for column-writing from the Associated Press Managing Editors. He was a recipient of the Pennsylvania Newsmedia Association's 2015 Benjamin Franklin Award for Excellence in recognition of "outstanding service" to the Pennsylvania newspaper industry. He was a recipient of the 2014 Common Cause of Pennsylvania Media Award for "distinguished reporting" on ethics and accountability in government. He is the author of the book "On the Front Lines of Pennsylvania Politics: Twenty-Five Years of Keystone Reporting"(The History Press, 2012). He is a founder and president of the Pennsylvania Press Club and a board member and past president of the Pennsylvania Legislative Correspondents Association.

In 2009, he was awarded the Simon Brute Medal by the Mount St. Mary's University National Alumni Association.

In 2020, he was interviewed by Penn State University's Department of Journalism for inclusion in its Pennsylvania Journalists Oral History Program.

The political website PoliticsPA gave him an "Honorable Mention" in their "Best Capitol Correspondent" feature, saying that Baer's "articles cut through all the Capitol B.S. and gives readers a simple, straightforward understanding of politics and state government." In 2002, the National Journal named him one of the top 10 political journalists outside Washington, DC. In 2005, he was named one of "Pennsylvania's Most Influential Reporters" by the Pennsylvania political news website PoliticsPA.

In 2007, he received a Second Place Keystone Press Award for his column from the Pennsylvania Newspaper Association. In 2008, the political website PolitickerPA.com named him one of the "Most Powerful Political Reporters" in Pennsylvania. In 2016 and in 2008, he received an "Honorable Mention" Keystone Press Award for his column from the Pennsylvania Newspaper Association. The Pennsylvania Report named him to the 2009 "The Pennsylvania Report 100" list of influential figures in Pennsylvania politics and described him as the "one journalist who should be read by all politicos."

In 2002, The National Journal tagged him one of the nation's top 10 political journalists outside Washington, saying he, "Has the ability to take the skin off of a politician without making it hurt too much."

Early life and education
Baer earned a degree from Mount St. Mary's University in Maryland and a master's degree from Temple University. He studied at the Brookings Institution and worked in Congress as a Fellow of the American Political Science Association. He also was a Fellow of the Loyola Law School in Los Angeles inaugural Journalist Law School program.

References

Living people
Temple University alumni
Mount St. Mary's University alumni
Journalists from Pennsylvania
Pennsylvania political journalists
American newspaper reporters and correspondents
Year of birth missing (living people)